Events from the year 1986 in Ireland.

Incumbents
 President: Patrick Hillery
 Taoiseach: Garret FitzGerald (FG)
 Tánaiste: Dick Spring (Lab)
 Minister for Finance:
 Alan Dukes (FG) (until 14 February 1986)
 John Bruton (FG) (from 14 February 1986)
 Chief Justice: Thomas Finlay
 Dáil: 24th
 Seanad: 17th

Events
 2 January – The national offices of the Progressive Democrats were officially opened.
 4 January – Phil Lynott, the lead singer of Thin Lizzy, died aged 35.
 11 February – Ireland's new football team manager, Jack Charlton, arrived in Dublin.
 18 March – Irish citizenship was conferred on Speaker of the United States House of Representatives, Tip O'Neill, for inspiring constitutional nationalists to launch an initiative for a new Ireland.
 31 March – President Hillery and Mrs. Hillery started a four-day official visit to Austria. This was the first Irish state visit there.
 4 May – Radiation from the devastated Chernobyl nuclear reactor in Ukraine reached Ireland.
 6 May – The Divorce Action Group launched its campaign for the forthcoming divorce referendum.
 21 May – Eighteen Old Master paintings from the Beit collection were stolen from Russborough House by Martin Cahill.
 30 May – Ireland West Airport Knock, County Mayo was officially opened.
 June (date unknown) – Mick Flavin became a new star of country music.
2 June – Fire destroyed Loreto Convent at St. Stephen's Green in Dublin; six nuns died in the blaze.
 6 June – John Stalker was removed from the 'shoot to kill' inquiry.
 12 June – Two giant pandas, Ming Ming and Ping Ping, arrived at Dublin Zoo.
 21 June – An anti-divorce rally took place in Dublin.
 27 June – Counting began in a Divorce Referendum. Tallymen predicted a strong 'no' vote.
 1 August – Monsignor James Horan, Parish Priest of Knock, County Mayo and builder of Knock Airport, died suddenly aged 75 in Lourdes.
 7 August – The deputy leader of the Democratic Unionist Party, Peter Robinson MP, was arrested and charged with illegal assembly, after a loyalist mob took over a village in County Monaghan.
 25–6 August – The remnants of Hurricane Charley struck Ireland. Dublin suffered its worst flooding since records began in 1880, and a new record for the greatest rainfall in one day was set when 200 millimetres of rain was measured at Kilcoole in County Wicklow. The Dodder and Dargle rivers in Dublin overflowed leading to flooding of 416 houses and 35 commercial premises.
 November – Giant's Causeway and the Causeway Coast became the first Irish designated UNESCO World Heritage Sites.
 23 October – Thirteen-year-old Philip Cairns disappeared on his way back to school after lunch.
 30 October – The 20 pence coin entered circulation.
 December (date unknown) – The Government banned South African food imports, about half the total of South African imports into Ireland, in protest against apartheid.
 25 December – Dublin Airport was open for the first time on a Christmas Day.
 31 December – American visa applications at the United States Embassy in Dublin rose by 25%. Thirty thousand people emigrated during 1986.

Arts and literature
 17 May – The Self Aid unemployment benefit concert was held in Dublin, featuring dozens of performers.
 Sigerson Clifford published the second edition of his poetry collection Ballads of a Bogman, including the first publication of "The Boys of Barr na Sráide".
 Bob Geldof published his autobiography, Is That It?
 Patrick McCabe published his novel, Music on Clinton Street.
 John Montague became the first occupant of the Ireland Chair of Poetry.
 The film Eat the Peach was released.

Sport

Association football
Ireland did not qualify for the 1986 FIFA World Cup.

Golf
The Irish Open was won by Seve Ballesteros (Spain).

Births
10 February – Steven Foley-Sheridan, soccer player.
17 February – Joey O'Brien, soccer player.
24 February – Claire Hennessy, author.
1 March – Shane O'Neill, Cork hurler.
4 April – Stephen Quinn, soccer player.
18 April – Conrad Logan, soccer player.
30 April – Derek Doyle, soccer player.
16 May – Andy Keogh, soccer player.
19 May – Paul Byrne, soccer player.
23 May – Shane McFaul, soccer player.
3 June – Donal Skehan, singer and television presenter.
8 June – Michael Shields, Cork Gaelic footballer, Australian rules footballer.
2 July – Katie Taylor, boxer
11 July – Gerard Nash, soccer player.
31 July – Gary Dicker, soccer player, Deirdre Codd , Wexford Camogie player.
22 August – Stephen Ireland, soccer player.
31 August – Colm Begley, Australian rules footballer.
10 September – Eoin Morgan, cricketer.
19 October – Shaun Williams, soccer player.
20 November – Evan McMillan, soccer player.

Deaths
4 January – Phil Lynott, singer and songwriter (born 1949).
10 February – James Dillon, former leader of Fine Gael, TD and Minister (born 1902).
12 February – James Joseph Magennis, British Royal Navy submariner awarded Victoria Cross for taking part in Operation Struggle in 1945 (born 1919).
1 March – Cahir Davitt, lawyer and judge (born 1894).
4 March – Edward McLysaght, genealogist and writer (born 1887).
16 March – Pat Carroll, Offaly hurler (born 1956).
28 March – Eddie McAteer, Nationalist Party (Northern Ireland) MP (born 1914).
13 May – Peadar O'Donnell, Irish Republican socialist, Marxist activist and writer (born 1893).
22 May – James Christopher Branigan, aka "Lugs Branigan", police officer and boxer (born 1910).
20 July – Dermot Honan. licensed vintner, member of the Seanad from 1965 to 1973.
1 August – James Horan, Roman Catholic monsignor, conceived and created Ireland West Airport Knock (born 1911).
1 October – Seán Moore, Fianna Fáil TD (born 1913).

Full date unknown
Eddie Duffy, traditional Irish musician (born 1894).
Cecil King, painter (born 1921).

See also
1986 in Irish television

References

 
1980s in Ireland
Years of the 20th century in Ireland
Ireland